Silesaurus is a genus of silesaurid dinosauriform from the Late Triassic, of what is now Poland.

Discovery
 
Fossilized remains of Silesaurus have been found in the Keuper Claystone in Krasiejów near Opole, Silesia, Poland, which is also the origin of its name. The type species, Silesaurus opolensis, was described by Jerzy Dzik in 2003. It is known from some 20 skeletons, making it one of the best-represented species of early dinosauriformes.

Description
 
Lightly built, it was probably a fast and agile animal with an active lifestyle. The snout was narrow with forward-pointing nostrils, and the large orbits likely provided Silesaurus with acute vision.

Initially, Silesaurus was thought to be strictly herbivorous, but later research on coprolite contents indicates that it may have been insectivorous, feeding on insects such as the beetle Triamyxa. The teeth of the animal were small, conical, and serrated, and were distributed irregularly in its jaws. The tip of the dentary had no teeth, and evidence suggests that it was  covered by a keratinous beak.

Classification

Scientists think that Silesaurus was not a dinosaur, but rather a dinosauriform. Dinosaurian features lacking in Silesaurus include an enlarged deltopectoral crest (a muscle attachment on the humerus), and epipophyses (enlarged tendon attachment above the postzygapophysis) on the cervical vertebrae.

However, Silesaurus has some dinosaurian characteristics as well:
 a brevis shelf (a bone surface on the ilium that functions as an attachment site for tail muscles)
 ischium with a slender shaft
 femur with a reduced tuberosity that borders the ligament of the femoral head
 a prominent lesser trochanter
 an overlap of the ascending process of the astragalus with the tibia
 a concave proximal articular surface for the reception of the distal end of the fibula on the calcaneum

As a result, alternative hypotheses place Silesaurus at or near the base of the ornithischian dinosaurs. Other scientists propose a basal link between the basal sauropodomorphs and ornithischians.
 

Systematic position after Nesbitt (2011):

Palaeobiology

Diet
Herbivory has been suggested for silesaurids in general and Silesaurus in particular based on tooth shape, and a 2014 study by the paleontologists Tai Kubo and Mugino O. Kubo of microwear on its teeth found it consistent with herbivory on soft objects, by comparing with wear on the teeth of extant mammals, though omnivory could not be ruled out. 

A 2019 study by paleontologist Martin Qvarnström and colleages examining coprolites (fossil dung) that contained beetles attributed them to Silesaurus based on size and other factors. These researchers suggested that while Silesaurus could exploit plant resources, it was not strictly a plant-eater. They pointed out that the teeth of Silesaurus were not numerous or regularly spaced, and lacked the coarse serrations typical in herbivores. They hypothesized that the beak-like jaws were adapted for pecking small insects off the ground like modern birds. They cautioned that there could have been other food sources that were not preserved in the coprolites, such as soft prey, plant fragments, and larger, more resistant items that were regurgitated,and that beetles could have been a seasonal food item. If so, this would represent the earliest known occurrence of this highly derived mode of feeding and have implications for the understanding of the evolutionary adaptations that would eventually lead up to the origin of dinosaurs.

Locomotion
 
Silesaurus and silesaurids in general have been considered quadrupedal due to their long, gracile forelimbs. In 2010, the paleontologists Rafał Piechowski and Jerzy Dzik considered such proportions typical of fast-running, quadrupedal animals, but noted that the long tail of Silesaurus which would have acted as a counterweight to the body, as well as the very gracile forelimbs, indicates it retained the ability for fast bipedal running. Piechowski and the paleontologist Mateusz Tałanda concluded in 2020 that the short hindlimbs combined with the elongated forelimbs supported the idea that it was an obligate quadruped.

Palaeoenvironment
Silesaurus lived in a subtropical environment similar to the modern Mediterranean basin with alternating summer monsoons and dry winters. The animal shared its environment of extensive swamplands and fern vegetation with a wealth of invertebrates as well as dipnoan and ganoid fishes, temnospondyls, phytosaurs and early pterosaurs.

References

Silesaurids
Late Triassic reptiles of Europe
Fossils of Poland
Opole County
Fossil taxa described in 2003